Duccio Innocenti (born 20 September 1975, in Prato) is an Italian association football. He is  currently managing the Lucchese football club and is a former player, who played as a defender. He won a gold medal at the 1997 Mediterranean Games in Bari with the Italy national under-21 football team.

Career

Player

Innocenti started his career at Fiorentina football club. Afterward he spent seasons with Pontedera of Serie C2 and Lucchese of Serie B, he was signed by Bari in summer 1998. Innocenti made his Serie A debut on 13 September 1998 against Venezia.

He followed Bari relegated in summer 2001, and played until summer 2003.

He was signed by Lazio on free transfer on 2 July 2003. But on 18 July 2003, he was transferred to Atalanta as part of the deal of Ousmane Dabo and Luciano Zauri.

He was a regular player for Atalanta in their 2003-04 season, but then he was promoted back to Serie A, he only played 8 games. After Atalanta relegated again in summer 2005, he played 6 times.

In January 2006, he was loaned to Messina for their rescue mission on Serie A seat, and lastly Messina stayed in the top division, but the club not willing to sign him permanently.

On 30 August 2006, he finally signed by AlbinoLeffe of Serie B. On 13 August 2007, he was signed by Serie B newcomer Grosseto. In February 2009, he was loaned, until the end of the season, to Vicenza Calcio From the season 2009-10 to 2011-12 he played for Lucchese in Eccellenza Tuscany.

Coach

In the season 2012-13 he is the manager of Lucchese in the Serie D.

References

External links
 gazzetta.it

Italian footballers
ACF Fiorentina players
S.S.D. Lucchese 1905 players
S.S.C. Bari players
Atalanta B.C. players
A.C.R. Messina players
U.C. AlbinoLeffe players
F.C. Grosseto S.S.D. players
S.S.D. Lucchese 1905 managers
L.R. Vicenza players
Serie A players
Serie B players
Association football defenders
People from Prato
1975 births
Living people
U.S. Città di Pontedera players
Mediterranean Games gold medalists for Italy
Competitors at the 1997 Mediterranean Games
Mediterranean Games medalists in football
Italian football managers
Sportspeople from the Province of Prato
Footballers from Tuscany